The Mill–Pine Neighborhood Historic District is a residential historic district located in Roseburg, Oregon, United States. Beginning in 1878, this neighborhood of modest homes developed to house employees of the adjacent railroad, and the service and retail workers who served them. Physical evolution of the district largely ceased after Southern Pacific Transportation Company moved its operational base from Roseburg to Eugene in 1927, leaving an unusually cohesive example of a working-class residential neighborhood of the late 19th and early 20th centuries. The historic district was listed on the National Register of Historic Places in 1985, and reduced in size in 2011 to reflect the destruction of some historic buildings.

See also
National Register of Historic Places listings in Douglas County, Oregon

References

External links

National Register of Historic Places in Douglas County, Oregon
Roseburg, Oregon
Historic districts on the National Register of Historic Places in Oregon
Neighborhoods in Oregon
1878 establishments in Oregon
Working-class culture in the United States